This is a list of flags of Île-de-France, including symbolic national and sub-regional flags, standards and banners used exclusively in Île-de-France.

Regional flags

Departmental flags

See also
List of French flags

Footnotes
 Registered at the French Society of Vexillology.

References

Île-de-France